Michael Scott Bogren (born 1958) is a Michigan attorney and a former nominee to be a district judge of the United States District Court for the Western District of Michigan.

Education and career 

Bogren majored in English literature and linguistics at Western Michigan University, receiving his Bachelor of Arts, cum laude, in 1979. He earned his Juris Doctor, cum laude, in 1982 from the University of Detroit Mercy School of Law.

Bogren is Chairman of Plunkett Cooney P.C.'s board of directors and the managing partner in the firm's Kalamazoo, Michigan, office. His practice focuses on representing municipalities in both federal and state courts, including First Amendment, zoning, and employment matters. He also serves as village attorney for the Village of Hopkins, Michigan.

Failed nomination to the district court 

On March 8, 2019, President Trump announced his intent to nominate Bogren to serve as a United States district judge for the United States District Court for the Western District of Michigan. On March 11, 2019, President Trump nominated Bogren to the seat vacated by Judge Robert Holmes Bell, who assumed senior status on January 31, 2017. On May 22, 2019, a hearing on his nomination was held before the Senate Judiciary Committee. In the hearing Bogren was aggressively questioned by senator Josh Hawley for his defense of the city of East Lansing's anti-discriminatory laws where according to Hawley’s summation he compared “Catholic family’s adherence to their religious beliefs with the views of the KKK,”. On June 11, 2019, amid a loss of support from three senators on the Judiciary Committee, Bogren asked for his name to be withdrawn from consideration to the federal District Court. The White House formally sent a notice of the withdrawal of Bogren's nomination to the Senate on June 26, 2019.

Personal life 

Bogren grew up in Parchment, Michigan. He is married with two adult children and lives in Hastings, Michigan.

See also 
 Donald Trump judicial appointment controversies

References 

1958 births
Living people
20th-century American lawyers
21st-century American lawyers
Federalist Society members
Michigan lawyers
People from Kalamazoo, Michigan
Western Michigan University alumni